Caan is a surname. Notable figures with the name include:

People
James Caan (1940–2022), American actor
James Caan (businessman) (born 1960), British entrepreneur
Scott Caan (born 1976), American actor
Caan (Dutch family), Dutch patrician family

Fictional characters
 Dalek Caan was at one point the sole surviving member of the fictional Dalek race in the television series Doctor Who.

See also
Kaan, given name and surname
Kahn, surname
Khan (surname)

Jewish surnames
Kohenitic surnames
Yiddish-language surnames